Entailment (ius aviticum, Ősiség, Aviticitas) was an act that did not allow the selling of the land rendering it (i.e. the estate) inalienable. This was observed in the Hungarian Kingdom from 1351 (King Louis I) until 1848. Széchenyi's Credit (Hitel,1830), among other things (e.g. Fiscalitas/háramlási jog/escheat), mainly revolved arourd this.

References

Legal history of Hungary